Doe or Die is the debut studio album by rapper AZ, released October 10, 1995 by EMI Records. The album features guest appearances by artists such as Nas and Miss Jones, and production from N.O. Joe, Pete Rock, L.E.S., and Buckwild, among others. The album spawned the single "Sugar Hill" - which was certified gold by the RIAA in 1995.

Upon release, Doe or Die received notable critical and commercial success. The album peaked at #15 on the Billboard 200, and #1 on the U.S. Top R&B/Hip Hop Albums chart. Doe or Die produced several singles, including, "Mo Money, Mo Murder," "Gimme Yours (remix)," "Doe or Die" and "Sugar Hill" - which was certified Gold by the RIAA in 1995. The album went on to sell over a million copies  A sequel, Doe or Die II, was released on September 10, 2021.

Content
The album incorporates fictitious tales chronicling the underworld lifestyle of organized crime. These cinematic narratives often depict a mobster's ascent to fame and wealth. Further emphasizing these themes, the cover of Doe or Die portrays AZ as an honoree of an elaborate mob funeral. Within the cover, a stylish portrait of AZ is surrounded by flowers, while the body of the rapper is buried in a casket that contains large amounts of dollars. In addition, the liner notes and the back of the album features images of AZ counting money, drinking expensive wine, and smoking cigars.

Reception

Upon its release, Doe or Die received generally favorable reviews from most music critics. Stanton Swihart from Allmusic gave the album 4 out of 5 stars and compared certain aspects of it to rapper Nas' debut album Illmatic, stating "The two albums are very much the twin sides of the same double-headed coin. They are so closely connected, in fact, that it's difficult to pinpoint where Doe or Dies points of departure are located." He further stated "Certainly it was one of the strongest, most promising debut efforts of 1995, and probably one of the year's strongest rap albums period." Christian Hoard from Rolling Stone gave the album 3 out of 5 stars, and called it a "Literate, sensitive look at street life that sits comfortably, as a companion, next to Nas' masterpiece (Illmatic)." Selwyn Seyfu Hinds from Spin rated the album 7 out of 10, and stated

Although praising the album's lyricism, and rating it 3 out of 4 stars, Los Angeles Times writer Cheo H. Coker criticized some of the album's production, describing some of it as "lackluster beats." A critic for RapReviews.com gave the album an 8.5 out of 10 rating and labeled it as "AZ's best album to date", with the "most replay value". In regards to the Mafioso content, he stated "This album does deserve to be mentioned right alongside Only Built 4 Cuban Linx..., It Was Written, and Reasonable Doubt for popularizing the Mafioso style. In fact, it dropped before two of those three albums did." He however gave criticism to some of the album's production, and lack of consistency, explaining "Despite the shortcomings, the good tracks on this album are not just good, they are great! There are four that I would refer to as certified classics. The main problem with the album is that it could have been an all time classic itself if executive production had been better and the beat selection had been a little more on point in several cases. All in all, this album is slept on and should be viewed as a gem that must be in every true head's collection.".

Track listing

Personnel

AZ - performer
Nas - performer
Amar Pep -	producer, performer
Buck Wild - producer
Void Caprio - engineer
D/R Period - producer
John Gamble - engineer
Jack Hersca - engineer
John Kogan - engineer
L.E.S. - producer
Lunatic Mind - producer
Henry Marquez - art direction
N.O. Joe - arranger, producer

Joe Pirrera - engineer
Pete Rock - producer
Erica Scott - vocals
Ski - remixing
Jamey Staub - engineer
Jason Vogel - engineer
Lindsey Williams - executive producer
Miss Jones - vocals
Barsham - performer
Spunk Biggs - producer
Lunatic mind - producer
Loose - producer

Album singles"Sugar Hill"Released: June 27, 1995
B-side: "Rather Unique""Gimme Yours (Remix)" [Non-album single]
Released: December 5, 1995
B-side: "Uncut Raw""Doe or Die"Released: April 2, 1996
B-side: "Mo Money, Mo Murder (Homicide)"

ChartsSingles'''

Doe or Die: 15th Anniversary
A 15th anniversary edition of Doe or Die was released on November 30, 2010, by AZ's own Quiet Money Records. Doe or Die: 15th Anniversary features production from Frank Dukes, Dave Moss, Statik Selektah, Baby Paul, Lil' Fame from M.O.P., and Roctimus Prime. The album also features vocals from R&B singer June Summers. All the songs from the original Doe or Die are remixed with a new beat.

See also
List of number-one R&B albums of 1995 (U.S.)

References

External links
 Doe or Die'' at Discogs

1995 debut albums
Albums produced by Buckwild
Albums produced by L.E.S. (record producer)
Albums produced by Pete Rock
Albums produced by Ski Beatz
EMI Records albums
AZ (rapper) albums
Mafioso rap albums